4-Vinylbenzyl chloride is an organic compound with the formula ClCH2C6H4CH=CH2.  It is a bifunctional molecule, featuring both vinyl and a benzylic chloride functional groups.  It is a colorless liquid that is typically stored with a stabilizer to suppress polymerization.

In combination with styrene, vinylbenzyl chloride is used as a comonomer in the production of chloromethylated polystyrene.  It is produced by the chlorination of vinyltoluene. Often vinyltoluene consists of a mixture of 3- and 4-vinyl isomers, in which case the vinylbenzyl chloride will also be produced as a mixture of isomers.

References

Monomers
Vinylbenzenes
Organochlorides